"Dolly" is a song by American rappers Lil Tecca and Lil Uzi Vert, released on September 18, 2020, as the fourth single from Tecca's debut studio album, Virgo World. The track was produced by BRackz, C4Bombs and TXBITHETEENVGER.

Background 
The song was originally leaked in 2018 with only Lil Uzi Vert on the track, and was remixed by Lil Tecca in 2019. Uzi confirmed that Tecca was on the newer version in 2020. The song is named after rapper Young Thug's sister, Dolly White.

Critical reception 
Orlando Dowlatt of Urban Islandz called Lil Tecca's flow on the track "smooth but quite interesting", and complimented Lil Uzi Vert's verse as a "scorcher".

Music video 
The official music video for the track was released on September 18, 2020, and was directed by Cole Bennett.

Charts

References 

2020 singles
2020 songs
Lil Tecca songs
Lil Uzi Vert songs
Republic Records singles
Songs written by Lil Tecca
Songs written by Lil Uzi Vert